Editor's note may refer to:
 A note made by an editor
Editor's Note, an American thoroughbred racehorse